Richard James Shannon (born 25 March 1955) is a  Democratic Unionist Party (DUP) politician in Northern Ireland. He has sat in the House of Commons of the United Kingdom since 2010 as the Member of Parliament (MP) for Strangford. He had previously sat in the Northern Ireland Assembly from 1998 to 2010 as the Member of the Legislative Assembly of Northern Ireland (MLA) for Strangford. He is an advocate for Leave Means Leave, a pro-Brexit campaign.

Personal life
Shannon was educated at Ballywalter Primary School and Coleraine Academical Institution. He was a soldier in the Ulster Defence Regiment in 1973–1975 and 1976–1977 and was awarded the General Service Medal. He served in the Royal Artillery TA from 1977 to 1988. He was expelled from the Territorial Army along with two of his colleagues after the theft of a replica Blowpipe missile by loyalists associated with the Ulster Resistance paramilitary group. The group intented to give the missile system to Apartheid South Africa in exchange for weapons. He is a member of the Orange Order and Apprentice Boys of Derry.
He has been voted "least sexy MP" in a list of all Westminster MPs but laughed off his position at the bottom of the poll. In 2022, Shannon broke down in tears as he thanked his "long-suffering" wife in the Commons. Shannon lost his mother-in-law to Covid-19 and has previously spoken about her in the House as well.

Political career
Shannon was a longstanding councillor, first elected to Ards Borough Council in 1985 and serving as Mayor in 1991–1992. He was elected as a member of the Northern Ireland Forum for Political Dialogue in 1996. Shannon was elected to the Northern Ireland Assembly for Strangford in 1998 and then re-elected in 2003 and 2007, representing the DUP.

At the 2010 general election Shannon won in his own constituency of Strangford with 14,926 votes compared to the runners-up, the Ulster Conservatives and Unionists (9,050 votes). The seat had been vacant since the resignation of fellow DUP MP Iris Robinson on 13 January 2010. Following his election to Westminster, he resigned his Assembly seat in favour of Simpson Gibson. He also resigned his council seat in favour of Joe Hagan, who was subsequently deselected.

In 2016, the Independent Parliamentary Standards Authority announced it was launching a formal investigation into Shannon's expenses. In 2015, he was the highest-claiming MP out of 650, claiming £205,798, not including travel. In 2016 the Independent Parliamentary Standards Authority found breaches of the MPs’ Scheme of Business Costs and Expenses by his constituency workers for claiming mileage and said £13,925 must be repaid by the MP.

In March 2019, Shannon was one of 21 MPs who voted against LGBT-inclusive sex and relationship education in English schools.

Shannon is one of the most active contributors to Parliamentary debates, intervening in almost every adjournment debate, which he says he does to support fellow backbench MPs who wish to raise issues in typically poorly attended debates.

Speaking in a House of Commons adjournment debate on Netflix, Shannon expressed his views on claims made by Margaret Hodge of alleged tax avoidance by the company, describing the behaviour as "simply disgraceful" and called for Government to "ensure that big business has to pay a reasonable rate of tax."

References

External links

1955 births
Ulster Defence Regiment soldiers
Royal Artillery soldiers
Members of Ards Borough Council
Democratic Unionist Party MLAs
Living people
Members of the Northern Ireland Forum
Northern Ireland MLAs 1998–2003
Northern Ireland MLAs 2003–2007
Northern Ireland MLAs 2007–2011
People from Banbridge
Members of the Parliament of the United Kingdom for County Down constituencies (since 1922)
UK MPs 2010–2015
UK MPs 2015–2017
UK MPs 2017–2019
UK MPs 2019–present
Democratic Unionist Party MPs